Peter Weck (born 12 August 1930) is an Austrian film director and actor. In addition to his about 130 film and television acting credits between 1954 and 2015, he worked as a director on more than 50 productions between 1969 and 2007.

Biography
Weck studied acting at the University of Music and Performing Arts Vienna and the Max Reinhardt Seminar. He made his film debut in 1954 and had a supporting role as Karl Ludwig of Austria in the 1955 historical drama Sissi (1955) with Romy Schneider. Weck found himself typecast in comedic and romantic roles in light entertainment films. He also appeared in a number of international film productions, as choir conductor Max Heller in the music film Almost Angels (1962) and as Romy Schneider's brother in Otto Premingers monumental drama The Cardinal (1963). In the 1980s, Weck had a leading role as the family father in the German television sitcom Ich heirate eine Familie (I Marry a Family).

Starting with the comedy film Help, I Love Twins, Weck also regularly worked as a film and television director until the 2000s. He directed his own sitcom Ich heirate eine Familie and a number of Tatort episodes. He was also successful as a stage director for a number of theatres which work together in the organization Vereinigte Bühnen Wien, co-founded by Weck in 1987. As a Theater manager in Vienna during the 1980s, he was responsible for the German-language premieres of the Andrew Lloyd Webber musicals Cats and The Phantom of the Opera. He also produced the original production of Elisabeth in 1992.

Selected filmography

Actor

 Victoria in Dover (1954)
 Sissi (1955)
 The Stolen Trousers (1956)
 Her Corporal (1956)
 Paradise for Sailors (1959)
 I Will Always Be Yours (1960)
 The Dream of Lieschen Mueller (1961)
 Mariandl (1961)
 Almost Angels (1962)
 Mariandl's Homecoming (1962)
 The Bird Seller (1962)
  (1962)
 The Forester's Daughter (1962)
  (1963, TV film)
  (1963)
 The Cardinal (1963)
 Marry Me, Cherie (1964)
 When the Grapevines Bloom on the Danube (1965)
 Always Trouble with the Teachers (1968)
 Why Did I Ever Say Yes Twice? (1969)
 Our Doctor is the Best (1969)
 The Reverend Turns a Blind Eye (1971)
 Who Laughs Last, Laughs Best (1971)
My Daughter, Your Daughter (1972)
 Trouble with Trixie (1972)
 Always Trouble with the Reverend (1972)
  (1973)
 Ich heirate eine Familie (1983–1986, TV series)
 I Desire You (1995, TV film)
  (1996, TV film)
 Aimee & Jaguar (1999)
  (2007, TV film)
 Germaine Damar – Der tanzende Stern (2011)
  (2012, TV film)
 The 7th Dwarf (2014)

Director
 Help, I Love Twins (1969)
  (1970)
 Don't Get Angry (1972)
 Kolportage (1980, TV film) — (based on Kolportage by Georg Kaiser)
  (1982, TV film) — (based on Mrs. 'Arris Goes to Paris)
 Ich heirate eine Familie (1983–1986, TV series)
 I Desire You (1995, TV film)
  (1996, TV film) — (Remake of Der Hofrat Geiger and Mariandl)
  (2007, TV film)

Decorations and awards
 1980: Title of Professor (awarded by the Austrian Ministry of Education)
 1984: Bambi Award
 1984: Golden Camera Award for Best Director for Ich heirate eine Familie (I married a family)
 1985: Golden Europe (Goldene Europa)
 1985: Golden Camera Award in the category of Most Popular TV Series pair (1st place HÖRZU reader's choice) (with Thekla Carola Wied)
 1985: Golden Medal of Honour for Services to the City of Vienna
 1988: Telestar
 1990: Bambi Award
 1990: Title Kammerschauspieler
 1990: Heinrich Abelé Award
 1990: Golden Romy as Favoured series Star
 1991: Karl Valentin Order
 1991: Tourism Award of the Vienna Chamber of Commerce for the musical Cats
 1992: Golden Europe
 1992: Golden Rathausmann
 1993: Austrian Decoration for Science and Art
 1993: Year of the Gourmet
 1993: Bacchus
 1996: Germany International Musical Award for his outstanding service to the German-language musical
 2000: Great Gold Medal for services to the province of Lower Austria
 2001: Gold Medal of Vienna
 2004: Grand Decoration of Honour in Silver for Services to the Republic of Austria (Grosses Silbernes Ehrenzeichen)
 2005: Platinum Romy for lifetime achievement
 2012: Crown of folk music for life work

References

External links
 

1930 births
Living people
Austrian male film actors
Austrian male television actors
20th-century Austrian male actors
21st-century Austrian male actors
Male actors from Vienna
Austrian television directors
Recipients of the Bambi (prize)
Recipients of the Romy (TV award)
Recipients of the Austrian Decoration for Science and Art
Recipients of the Grand Decoration for Services to the Republic of Austria